Union Church Presbyterian Church is a historic church on MS 550 in Union Church, Mississippi.

It was built in 1852 and added to the National Register in 1979.

References

Further reading

Churches on the National Register of Historic Places in Mississippi
Churches in Jefferson County, Mississippi
Presbyterian Church in America churches in Mississippi
National Register of Historic Places in Jefferson County, Mississippi